The Community Service Society of New York (CSS) is an independent, nonprofit organization established in 1939.  Originally formed as a charity providing direct assistance to the poor, its mission has evolved include research and advocacy as well as legal and informational support services for other organizations that work with low-income individuals.  It is one of the seven organizations supported by The New York Times "Neediest Cases Fund".

History
The Community Service Society was formed in 1939 by the merger of two of New York City's most prominent social welfare organizations, the Association for Improving the Condition of the Poor, organized in 1843 and incorporated in 1848, and the Charity Organization Society, founded in 1882.

Purpose
CSS tackles poverty on many fronts, bringing a unique perspective to the field of urban poverty. From Government agencies to elected officials; from grass roots advocacy groups to major media outlets, CSS works to raise awareness about, and provide solutions to the problems facing low-income New Yorkers.

The Community Service Society:
Conducts research that helps shape public policies concerning poverty.
Advocates for low-income New Yorkers at all levels of government.
Provides direct services and technical assistance to individuals and organizations.
Engages volunteers who help build stronger communities.

Programs
CSS works independently and in coalition with other organizations on issues of urban poverty in the areas of health care, affordable housing, the labor market, public benefit programs and properly financed public education. The coexistence of CSS's program and policy work have resulted in the creation of model programs such as the Retired Senior Volunteer Program (RSVP). Conceived on Staten Island in 1967 with 23 volunteers, RSVP now is one of the largest volunteer programs for older adults in the United States, with 9 000 men and women volunteering in agencies throughout the city.

CSS has also engaged in Community development initiatives: Through employment projects, tenant associations, health care and civic participation that engaged the residents in finding innovative ways to fortify their community, the Gates Avenue project helped to revitalize a neighborhood in Bedford–Stuyvesant, Brooklyn.

CSS's Social Services Department serves individuals, families and seniors who are undergoing a temporary emergency with a range of services from eviction prevention, financial assistance to housing and job searches.

In November 2009, CSS acquired City Limits Magazine.

References

External links
 Community Service Society of New York Homepage

Poverty in the United States
Non-profit organizations based in New York City
1939 establishments in New York City
Organizations established in 1939